Scratch My Back is the eighth studio album (and fifteenth album overall) by English musician Peter Gabriel, his first in eight years. It was released in February 2010. The album, recorded at Air Lyndhurst and Real World Studios during 2009, consists of cover versions of twelve songs by various artists, using only orchestra and voice. It is produced by Gabriel with Bob Ezrin.

The album generally received favourable reviews by music journalists and performed well on the album charts around the world, peaking at No. 1 in Belgium, No. 2 in Germany and Canada, and No. 3 in the Czech Republic, Italy and Switzerland. It also reached the top 5 in France and Sweden. In Gabriel's native United Kingdom it peaked at No. 12 on the UK Albums Chart on 21 February 2010, the week following its release. In the United States it peaked at No. 26 on the Billboard 200, No. 2 on the Independent Albums chart and No. 3 on the Rock Albums chart on 12 March 2010.

Scratch My Back was initially released on compact disc and as music download; a vinyl album edition was subsequently released in late March 2010.

Background
The idea behind the Scratch My Back project is a song exchange where each artist would cover one of Gabriel's songs in return for his covering one of theirs; the other artists' renditions of Gabriel's songs were to appear on an album titled I'll Scratch Yours. Initially planned to be released simultaneously with Scratch My Back in 2010, several artists were late in delivering their songs or ultimately declined to participate, necessitating changes to the companion album's concept. With several new artists aboard, the slightly retitled And I'll Scratch Yours was released in September 2013.

According to Gabriel, although he and arranger John Metcalfe had talked about Arvo Pärt and Steve Reich as inspiration, it was the work that Metcalfe did on "Heroes" that "gave us the confidence to be bold in the way in which we were going to approach the record." "Heroes" became the opening track because "without any of the drive of guitar and drums...it builds an enormous tension that bursts open."

Stephin Merritt, who wrote "The Book of Love", commented on Gabriel's cover of his song:

Gabriel's cover of "The Book of Love" appeared earlier in the 2004 film Shall We Dance?, on the series Scrubs in the season 8 finale episode entitled "My Finale," and South Park season 19 episode "Tweek x Craig." "My Body is a Cage" appeared in the episode "Out of the Chute" from the seventh season of the American medical drama House, the teaser trailer to John Carter, in the promo for the TV show Almost Human, in the final episode of Lucifer, in the ‘’Santa Clara Vanguard Drum and Bugle Corps Drum Corps International world championship winning production “Babylon”, and in the season 2 finale of Dark. His cover of "Heroes" appeared in the feature film Lone Survivor,  and also on several TV shows, including the end credits for the fourth season finale of Big Love, and at the end of episodes "Chapter Three: Holly, Jolly" and "Chapter Eight: The Battle of Starcourt" of Stranger Things and Stranger Things 3 respectively.

Cover art
The cover artwork is a micrograph of two red blood cells folding over each other. It was shot by Steve Gschmeissner and was included in the cover by Marc Bessant. Not coincidentally, the name of Gabriel's supporting tour for the album is "The New Blood Tour". The  album's graphic design concept is credited to Marc Bessant and Peter Gabriel.

Track listing

Singles
Gabriel originally intended to release Scratch My Back and I'll Scratch Yours simultaneously. However, as completion of the latter dragged out, it was instead decided to release a series of double A-sided singles with one song from each album every new full moon during 2010 on iTunes. The first, "The Book of Love" – Gabriel's cover of a Magnetic Fields song, together with "Not One of Us" – Stephin Merritt's (The Magnetic Fields' frontman) cover of a Peter Gabriel song, was released on 30 January 2010. Gabriel's version of "The Boy in the Bubble" coupled with Paul Simon's version of "Biko" was the second, released on 28 February 2010. The third in the series, Gabriel's take on "Flume" paired with Bon Iver's seven-minute long version of "Come Talk to Me" was released on 30 March 2010.

On 17 April 2010 "The Book of Love" / "Not One of Us" as well as "Flume" / "Come Talk to Me" were also released on 7" vinyl to independent record stores.

Personnel
 Peter Gabriel – production, arrangement ("The Book of Love"), design concept
 Bob Ezrin – production
 John Metcalfe – arrangement (except "The Book of Love" and "I Think It's Going to Rain Today"), mixing (except "I Think It's Going to Rain Today"), orchestration (except "The Book of Love"), additional "Oxford" recording
 Nick Ingman – arrangement ("The Book of Love"), orchestration ("The Book of Love")
 Will Gregory – arrangement ("The Book of Love")
 Randy Newman – arrangement ("I Think It's Going to Rain Today")
 Richard Chappell – mixing, engineering (except "The Book of Love"), Air Studios sessions recording
 Tchad Blake – mixing ("My Body is a Cage", "Après moi")
 Pete Sené – assistant engineering (except "The Book of Love")
 Mark Claydon – assistant mixing (except "The Book of Love")
 Kurina Támas – recording ("The Book of Love")
 Kölcsényi Attila – recording ("The Book of Love")
 Steve Orchard – Air Studios sessions recording
 Olga Fitzroy – Air Studios sessions recording assistant, Pro Tools editor
 Laurence Greed – Pro Tools editor assistant
 Melanie Gabriel – vocals ("The Book of Love")
 London Scratch Orchestra – orchestra performance
 The Choir of Christ Church Cathedral, Oxford – choir ("My Body is a Cage")
 Hungarian Orchestra - orchestra performance ("The Book of Love")
 Tony Cousins – mastering
 Marc Bessant – graphic design, design concept
 Nadav Kander – photography
 David Hiscock – photography

Reception

Scratch My Back received generally positive reviews from most music critics. At Metacritic, which assigns a normalised rating out of 100 to reviews from mainstream critics, it received an average score of 67 based on 21 reviews.

Scratch My Back was album of the month in the March 2010 issue of Mojo. Reviewer Mat Snow writes: "He [Gabriel] and his top-of-the-range collaborators (...) have created an album of great insight into the untapped potential of familiar songs, a profound re-imagining made manifest in an orchestral soundworld as rich and thrilling as ever recorded at Air (...)". He gave special mention to the reinterpretations of David Bowie’s "Heroes" ("the song’s underlying despair rises to the top"), Paul Simon’s "The Boy in the Bubble" ("the song it might have been had not the writer been so determined in 1986 to bring the joys of South African township jive to the Western pop charts") and Talking Heads' "Listening Wind" ("Gabriel shines a soft light into the song's inner desolation"). On the downside Snow describes the version of Lou Reed’s "The Power of the Heart" as "a misstep" and Randy Newman’s "I Think It's Going to Rain Today" as "superfluous". He concludes the review on a positive note by saying: "An album to make you happy feeling sad, Scratch My Back gets better with each play; it might just turn out to be the best surprise birthday present of the year."

In Metro, Arwa Haider awarded the album 3 stars out of 5 and commented: "Its most impressive quality is sensitivity; these are elegant orchestral arrangements … It’s sporadically successful; Gabriel saps the life from Paul Simon’s The Boy in the Bubble and somehow over-eggs Arcade Fire’s My Body Is a Cage" and concluded "this is exceptionally classy karaoke."

In The New York Times, Jon Pareles wrote: "Covers albums don’t get any more idiosyncratic or high concept than Scratch My Back."

Pitchfork Media reviewer Mark Richardson was less enthusiastic: "Every song on Scratch My Back, regardless of its original tone or meaning, is flattened out and turned into this one melodramatic and depressing thing (...)"; although the album "sounds earnest [and] professional", it consists of "ponderous, dull, and ultimately pointless versions of songs that sound much better elsewhere."

Charts and certifications

Weekly charts

Year-end charts

Certifications

Release history

References

External links
 

Peter Gabriel albums
2010 albums
Real World Records albums
Virgin Records albums
Albums produced by Bob Ezrin
Covers albums
Albums recorded at AIR Studios